Filodes baratalis is a moth in the family Crambidae. It was described by William Jacob Holland in 1900. It is found on Buru in Indonesia.

References

Moths described in 1900
Spilomelinae
Moths of Indonesia